Agaricus silvaticus (or Agaricus sylvaticus), otherwise known as the scaly wood mushroom, blushing wood mushroom, or pinewood mushroom, is a species of mushroom often found in groups in coniferous forests from early summer, or September through to November in Europe, North Africa and North America.

Description

The greyish-brown cap is hemispherical when young, but later flattens out up to 10 cm in diameter. It is covered with broad scales. The gills are grey when young, and become much darker with age. The spores are chocolate brown. The stem is brownish, often with a hanging ring and a small bulb at the base.
The flesh is white with a mild taste, turning reddish when cut.

Although one field guide lists the species as edible, another does not recommend it on the basis of its being related to species that cause gastric upset.

Naming

The species name sylvaticus (or silvaticus) means "of the woods".  Both spellings are found in the literature, but Species Fungorum gives sylvaticus as the current name and so that version should be preferred.

This well-known species was first validly described under the current name, Agaricus silvaticus, in 1774 by the early mycologist Jacob Christian Schäffer.  At that time most gilled mushrooms were all grouped under the genus Agaricus, but later were allocated to new genera which reflected their different characteristics.  Now Agaricus has a much more restricted meaning, being the genus of the common cultivated mushrooms of Europe and America, but A. sylvaticus belongs to that group and has kept the same name during all that time.

Similar species

Agaricus haemorrhoidarius is normally considered a synonym, but has also been defined as a separate species, distinguished by its flesh which immediately turns red when cut.
Agaricus phaeolepidotus is distinguished by a stem which yellows (in addition to turning pink) when cut. The cap background is browner than A. silvaticus and its smell suggests iodine or ink.
Tricholoma vaccinum looks similar from above but has no ring and develops reddish-brown gills.

See also
 List of Agaricus species

References

External links

silvaticus
Fungi of Europe